The 2010–11 Coppa Italia, also known as TIM Cup for sponsorship reasons, was the 64th season of the competition. As in the previous year, 78 clubs took part in the tournament. Internazionale were the cup holders and successfully retained the trophy. It was Inter Milan's last competitive title until winning the Serie A title in 2021.

Participating teams
Serie A (20 teams)

 Bari
 Bologna
 Brescia
 Cagliari
 Catania
 Cesena
 Chievo
 Fiorentina
 Genoa
 Internazionale
 Juventus
 Lazio
 Lecce
 Milan
 Napoli
 Palermo
 Parma
 Roma
 Sampdoria
 Udinese

Serie B (22 teams)

 AlbinoLeffe
 Ascoli
 Atalanta
 Cittadella
 Crotone
 Empoli
 Frosinone
 Grosseto
 Livorno
 Modena
 Novara
 Padova
 Pescara
 Piacenza
 Portosummaga
 Reggina
 Sassuolo
 Siena
 Torino
 Triestina
 Varese
 Vicenza

Lega Pro (27 teams)

 Alessandria
 Atletico Roma
 Benevento
 Catanzaro
 Cavese
 Como
 Cosenza
 Cremonese
 FeralpiSalò
 Foligno
 Gubbio
 Juve Stabia
 Lucchese
 Lumezzane
 Monza
 Ravenna
 Reggiana
 Salernitana
 San Marino
 Sorrento
 SPAL
 Spezia
 Südtirol
 Taranto
 Ternana
 Hellas Verona
 Virtus Lanciano

LND - Serie D (9 teams)

 AlzanoCene
 Carpi
 Este
 Guidonia
 Pomezia
 Santegidiese
 Trapani
 Virtus Casarano
 Virtus Entella

Format and seeding

Teams entered the competition at various stages, as follows:
 First phase (one-legged fixtures)
 First round: 36 teams from Lega Pro and Serie D started the tournament
 Second round: the 18 winners from the previous round were joined by the 22 Serie B teams
 Third round: the 20 winners from the second round met the 12 Serie A sides seeded 9–20
 Fourth round: the 16 survivors face each other
 Second phase
 Round of 16 (one-legged): the 8 fourth round winners were inserted into a bracket with the Serie A clubs seeded 1-8
 Quarterfinals (one-legged)
 Semifinals (two-legged)
 Final at the Stadio Olimpico in Rome

Matches

Elimination rounds

Section 1

Match details

First round

Second round

Third round

Fourth round

Section 2

Match details

First round

Second round

Third round

Fourth round

Section 3

Match details

First round

Second round

Third round

Fourth round

Section 4

Match details

First round

Second round

Third round

Fourth round

Section 5

Match details

First round

Second round

Third round

Fourth round

Section 6

Match details

First round

Second round

Third round

Fourth round

Section 7

Match details

First round

Second round

Third round

Fourth round

Section 8

Match details

First round

Second round

Third round

Fourth round

Final stage

Bracket

Round of 16

Quarter-finals

Semi-finals

First leg

Second leg

Internazionale won 2–1 on aggregate.

Palermo won 4–3 on aggregate.

Final

Top goalscorers

References
General
 
Specific

Coppa Italia seasons
Italy
Coppa Italia